Nanhai District Stadium (Simplified Chinese: 南海区体育场) is a multi-use stadium in Foshan, China.  It is currently used mostly for football matches and athletics events. This stadium's capacity is 8,000 people and was built in 1989.

References

Buildings and structures in Foshan
Sports venues in Guangdong
Football venues in China